Catherine Jean Prendergast is an American literary scholar. She is professor of English at the University of Illinois Urbana-Champaign.

Biography 
Prendergast received her B.A. from Columbia University in 1990 and a Ph.D. from the University of Wisconsin–Madison. Her research focuses on the intersections of social and literary, cultural movements as well as the spread of the English language.

Her book Literacy and Racial Justice: The Politics of Learning after Brown v. Board of Education (2003) has won the Mina P. Shaughnessy Award from the Modern Language Association for "an outstanding scholarly book in the fields of language, culture, literacy, and literature that has a strong application to the teaching of English."

Prendergast received a Guggenheim Fellowship in 2014 for her book, The Gilded Edge, which investigates the circumstances surrounding the suicides of Nora May French, George Sterling, and Carrie Sterling by cyanide ingestion.

Personal life and family 
Her father, Kevin H. Prendergast, was the chair of Columbia's astronomy department known for his work in the field of many-body systems. Her uncle, Robert Prendergast, was a coxswain for Columbia's rowing team who painted the blue and white "C" over the Spuyten Duyvil cliff and later a professor at Johns Hopkins University.

References 

Living people
Columbia College (New York) alumni
University of Illinois Urbana-Champaign alumni
University of Wisconsin alumni
American women academics
Women scholars and academics
Year of birth missing (living people)